Twig is a template engine for the PHP programming language. Its syntax originates from Jinja and Django templates. It's an open source product licensed under a BSD License and maintained by Fabien Potencier.  The initial version was created by Armin Ronacher. Symfony PHP framework comes with a bundled support for Twig as its default template engine since version 2.

Features 
 Complex control flow
 Automatic escaping
 Template inheritance
 Variable filters
 i18n support (gettext)
 Macros
 Fully extendable

Twig is supported by the following integrated development environments:
 Eclipse via the Twig plugin
 Komodo and Komodo Edit via the Twig highlight/syntax check mode
 NetBeans via the Twig syntax plugin (until 7.1, native as of 7.2)
 PhpStorm (native as of 2.1)

And the text editors:
 Atom via the PHP-twig for atom
 Emacs via web-mode.el
 Notepad++ via the Notepad++ Twig Highlighter
 Sublime Text via the Twig bundle
 TextMate via the Twig bundle
 Vim via the Jinja syntax plugin or the vim-twig plugin
 Brackets via Brackets Twig
 Visual Studio Code via the Twig extension
 GTKSourceView via the Twig language definition
 Coda via the Twig syntax mode
 Coda 2 via the other Twig syntax mode
 SubEthaEdit via the Twig syntax mode

Syntax 
Twig defines three kinds of delimiters:
 {{ ... }}, to print the content of variables or the result of evaluating an expression (e.g.: an inherited Twig template with {{ parent() }}).
 {# ... #}, to add comments in the templates. These comments aren't included in the rendered page.
 {% ... %}, to execute statements, such as for-loops.
 {% set foo = 'bar' %}, to assign.
 {% if i is defined and i == 1%} ... {% endif %}: condition.
 {% for i in 0..10 %} ... {% endfor %}: counter in a loop.

The apostrophe (') is the escape character.

To create an iterative array:
{% set myArray = [1, 2] %}

An associative array:
{% set myArray = {'key': 'value'} %}

Operators precedence 
The operators precedence is, from the less to more priority:

Filters 
The filters provide some treatments on an expression, when placed after it, separated by pipes. For example:
 capitalize: changes a string's first letter to capital.
 upper: changes a whole string to capital.
 first: displays the first line of an array.
 length: returns a variable size.

Special variables 
 loop contains the current loop information. For example loop.index corresponds to the number of iterations which have already occurred.
 The global variables begin with underscores. For example:
 _route (URL part located after the domain)
 _self (current file name)
So, to the a page route: {{ path(app.request.attributes.get('_route'), app.request.attributes.get('_route_params')) }}
 The CGI environment variables, such as {{ app.request.server.get('SERVER_NAME') }}.

Example 
The example below demonstrates some basic features of Twig.
{% extends "base.html" %}
{% block navigation %}
    <ul id="navigation">
    {% for item in navigation %}
        <li>
            <a href="{{ item.href }}">
                {% if item.level == 2 %}  {% endif %}
                {{ item.caption|upper }}
            </a>
        </li>
    {% endfor %}
    </ul>
{% endblock navigation %}

See also 

 Smarty

References

External links 
 
Templating Engines in PHP, Fabien Potencier, 2009

Template engines
PHP libraries
Free software programmed in PHP
Drupal